Regulate... G Funk Era is the debut studio album by American rapper Warren G. It was released on June 7, 1994, by Violator Records and distributed by Def Jam Recordings. The album's biggest hit was the eponymous single "Regulate", a gritty depiction of West Coast gang life which samples singer Michael McDonald's hit "I Keep Forgettin' (Every Time You're Near)" and featured Nate Dogg. The album also contained the top ten hit "This D.J." The song "Regulate" was also featured on the Above the Rim soundtrack, which was released on March 22, 1994. An altered version of the song "So Many Ways" appeared in the 1995 film Bad Boys.

Reception

The album received generally positive reviews from critics. Spin highly recommended the album, concluding: "Truth be told, Warren G. wasn't cut out to be a hardass. He's a romantic, in love with soft sound." Critic Robert Christgau commented positively regarding the coolly menacing nature of the music. Warren G also received two Grammy nominations: "This D.J." was nominated for a 1995 Grammy Award for Best Rap Solo Performance, while "Regulate" was nominated for a 1995 Grammy for Best Rap Performance by a Duo or Group.

Commercial performance
The album debuted at #2 on the US Billboard Top 200 albums chart, selling 176,000 in its opening week. The album later went on the sell over 3 million copies in the US and has been certified triple platinum by the Recording Industry Association of America (RIAA).

2014 re-release
The album was re-released in 2014, to coincide with the 20th anniversary of the album. It includes 3 additional mixes of "Regulate"; the "Destructo & Wax Motif Remix", featuring Motif, the "Photek Remix" featuring Nate Dogg, and the "Jauz Remix", also featuring Nate Dogg.

Track listing 

Regulate...G Funk Era

Personnel 
Warren G - Vocals, Producer
Nate Dogg - Vocals
Chris Lighty -	Executive Producer
Paul Stewart -	Executive Producer
John Philip Shenale - Editing
John Morris - Assistant Engineer, Mixing, Mixing Assistant
Greg Geitzenauer - Keyboards, Mixing, Engineer
Mike Ainsworth - Assistant Engineer
Ulysses Noriega - Assistant Engineer
George "Yorrgi" Gallegos - Assistant Engineer
Christopher C. Murphy - Assistant Engineer/Runner
Tony Green - Bass
Daniel Shulman - Bass
Che Laird - Guitar
Andreas Straub - Guitar
Morris O'Connor - Guitar
Sean "Barney" Thomas - Keyboards
Carl "Butch" Small - Percussion
The Dove Shack  - Vocals, Vocals (Background)
Ricky Harris - Vocals
B-Tip - Vocals
Deon - Vocals
Dewayne - Vocals
Lady Levi - Vocals
Jah-Skilz - Vocals
G-Child (Warren G) - Vocals (Background)
O.G.L.B. - Vocals (Background)
Bernie Grundman - Mastering
Michael Miller - Photography

Samples
Regulate
 "I Keep Forgettin' (Every Time You're Near)" by Michael McDonald
 "Sign of the Times" by Bob James
 "Let Me Ride" by Dr. Dre 
Do You See
 "Bicentennial Blues" by Gil Scott-Heron
 "Juicy Fruit" by Mtume
 "Mama Used to Say" by Junior
Super Soul Sis
 "Don't Stop (Ever Loving Me)" by One Way
 "Why Have I Lost You" by Cameo
 "Nuthin' but a 'G' Thang (Freestyle Remix)" by Snoop Dogg
94 Ho Draft
 "Groove to Get Down" by T-Connection
This Is The Shack
"Ode To Billie Joe" by Lou Donaldson
"Pass The Dutchie" by Musical Youth
This D.J.
 "Curious" by Midnight Star
 "Juicy Fruit" by Mtume
 "Paid in Full" by Eric B and Rakim
And Ya Don't Stop
 "Janitzio" by Don Julian
Runnin' Wit No Breaks
 "Go On and Cry" by Les McCann & Eddie Harris
 "N.T." by Kool & the Gang
 "Tha Next Episode (Unreleased)" by Snoop Doggy Dogg & Dr. Dre
So Many Ways
"Take Your Time (Do It Right)" by The S.O.S. Band
What's Next
"Adventures of Super Rhyme (Rap)" by Jimmy Spicer
"Mind Blowing Decisions" by Heatwave
"Conjunction Function" by Bob Dorough feat. Jack Sheldon and Terri Morel
Recognize
"Doggy Dogg World" by Snoop Dogg feat. Kurupt, Daz Dillinger and The Dramatics
"Genius Is Back" by Mix Master Spade and Compton Posse

Charts

Weekly charts

Year-end charts

Singles – Billboard (North America)

Certifications

See also
List of number-one R&B albums of 1994 (U.S.)

References

External links
 Warren G fansite

1994 debut albums
Def Jam Recordings albums
Warren G albums
Albums produced by Warren G
G-funk albums